Belinda is the debut studio album by American singer Belinda Carlisle. It was released on May 19, 1986 by I.R.S. Records. Carlisle began work on the album in 1985 following the breakup of the Go-Go's, for whom she was the lead singer. The album was supported by four singles, with lead single "Mad About You" peaking at number 3 on the US Billboard Hot 100 and No. 1 in Canada.

Background and writing
Some of the songs on Belinda were written by Carlisle's former bandmates in the Go-Go's Charlotte Caffey and Paula Jean Brown while the rest of the tracks were written by other songwriters such as the Bangles' Susanna Hoffs. Carlisle has a single co-writing credit on one track ("Gotta Get to You"). "Band of Gold" was a hit song for Freda Payne in 1970. Payne provided background vocals on the dance mixes of Carlisle's version of the song, which would later appear as bonus tracks on the 2003 re-release of the album.

"I Need a Disguise" was written by the team of Tom Kelly and Billy Steinberg who co-wrote the song with Susanna Hoffs as it was originally intended for use by the Bangles.  Kelly and Steinberg also co-wrote another song for Carlisle called "Dancing in the City", which she would eventually record and would later appear on the soundtrack for the 1987 movie Burglar. "Stuff and Nonsense" is a cover of Tim Finn's song originally performed by his band Split Enz on their 1979 album Frenzy. The song "Shot In the Dark" was used as part of the Out of Bounds soundtrack.

Reception 
Upon release, Belinda was met with mixed reviews from critics. Mark Coleman of Rolling Stone wrote "The problem with Belinda is that all the ingredients are there, but the end result just doesn't feel right." Stephen Thomas Erlewine of AllMusic commented retrospectively that "The pop on Belinda may not be as infectious as the Go-Go's' finest singles, yet it fit in well with the slick formats of mid-'80s radio and managed to be more memorable than many of the mainstream hits of the time, as the ingratiating hit "Mad About You" proves."

Commercial performance
The album was successful in North America peaking at No. 13 on the Billboard 200 and at number 24 on the Canadian Albums chart. It was moderately successful in Australia, where it peaked at number 42 and charted for 12 weeks. Belinda was certified Gold in the US and Platinum in Canada, selling over one million copies worldwide.

Track listing

Album credits

Personnel
 Belinda Carlisle – lead vocals, backing vocals
 Jim Cox – keyboards, synthesizer 
 Claude Gaudette – keyboards, synthesizer
 Nicky Hopkins – keyboards, synthesizer
 Michael Lloyd – keyboards, synthesizer
 Bobby Martin – keyboards, synthesizer, saxophone (6)
 John Philip Shenale – keyboards, synthesizer
 Charlotte Caffey – guitars, backing vocals 
 Laurence Juber – guitars
 Andy Taylor – guitars, guitar solo (1)
 David Lindley – guitars
 Paula Brown – bass guitar, backing vocals
 Dennis Belfield – bass guitar
 Paul Leim – drums
 Paulinho da Costa – percussion
John Rosenberg –  trumpet (10)
 John D'Andrea – string arrangements (3, 6, 10)
 Sid Sharp – string direction (3, 6, 10)
 Susanna Hoffs – backing vocals
 Tom Kelly – backing vocals
 Billy Steinberg – backing vocals
 Nathan Lam – backing vocals
 Jane Wiedlin – backing vocals
 Elisa Fox – backing vocals
 The Waters – backing vocals

Production
 Producer and Arrangements –Michael Lloyd
 Associate Producer – Nathan Lam
 Additional Vocal Production – Ellen Shipley and Robert Feist
 Engineer – Carmine Rubino
 Assistant Engineer – Dan Nebenzal
 Remixing – William Orbit
 Remix Assistant – Tania Hayward
 Recorded and Mixed at Guerilla Studios (North London, England).
 Musical Instruments by Don Griffin 
 Cover Photo – Matthew Rolston 
 Sleeve Photos – Bradford Bramson
 Art Direction and Design – Belinda Carlisle and Carl Grasso
 Management – Danny Goldberg and Ron Stone

Charts

Weekly charts

Year-end charts

Certifications

References

1986 debut albums
Albums produced by Michael Lloyd (music producer)
Belinda Carlisle albums
I.R.S. Records albums